The Watson ministry (Labour) was the 3rd ministry of the Government of Australia, and the first national Labour government formed in the world. It was led by the country's 3rd Prime Minister, Chris Watson. The Watson ministry succeeded the First Deakin ministry, which dissolved on 27 April 1904 after Labour withdrew their support and Alfred Deakin was forced to resign. The ministry was replaced by the Reid ministry on 17 August 1904 after the Protectionist Party withdrew their support over the Conciliation and Arbitration Bill.

Billy Hughes, who died in 1952, was the last surviving member of the Watson ministry; Hughes was also the last surviving member of the First Fisher ministry, Third Fisher ministry, Second Hughes ministry and Third Hughes ministry.

Ministry

Notes

References

Ministries of Edward VII
Australian Commonwealth ministries
Australian Labor Party ministries
1904 establishments in Australia
1904 disestablishments in Australia
Cabinets established in 1904
Cabinets disestablished in 1904